The 22d Air Transport Squadron may refer to:

 The 922d Expeditionary Reconnaissance Squadron, which was active as the 22d Air Transport Squadron, Medium at Charleston Air Force Base, South Carolina from 8 March 1954 to 18 March 1958.
 The 22d Air Transport Squadron, which was active from 1 June 1948 at Fairfield-Suisun Air Force Base.  This squadron replaced the second listed 22d Air Transport Squadron (Provisional).  On 1 October 1948 it was redesignated the 1267th Air Transport Squadron.  It was discontinued on 23 April 1949.
 The 22d Air Transport Squadron (Provisional), which was active from c. 14 March 1947 to 7 May 1947 at Morrison Field, Florida.
 The 22d Air Transport Squadron (Provisional), which was active from c. 23 April 1947 to 2 June 1948 at Fairfield-Suisun Army Air Field (later Fairfield-Suisun Air Force Base), California.  This unit was replaced by the 22d Air Transport Squadron.